And So It Begins or So It Begins may refer to:

Music
And So It Begins, a 2008 album by Joshua Bartholomew
And So It Begins, a 2016 album by Eva Celia
And So It Begins, a 2011 EP by The Reelers
"And So It Begins", from the soundtrack of 1980 film Loving Couples
So It Begins, a 2007 album by Profugus Mortis

Television
"And So It Begins", an episode of TV series Reckless
"And So It Begins", an episode of TV series Alone
"And So It Begins", an episode of TV series 90 Day Fiancé: Before the 90 Days
 
"So It Begins", an episode of TV show Alias (season 1)

Other uses
And So It Begins, a 2018 novel by Rachel Abbott
"And So it Begins...", an episode of the Digimon Adventure anime series